Hillary Menos (born 1964 in Luton) is an English poet. She studied philosophy, politics and economics at Wadham College, Oxford, then worked as a food journalist and restaurant critic in London before moving to Devon to renovate a Domesday manor. She ran a 100-acre organic farm near Totnes with her husband and four sons between 2004 and 2012. She now lives in France.

Awards
 2010: Forward Poetry Prize: Felix Dennis Prize for Best First Collection for Berg

References

English women poets
British restaurant critics
Living people
1964 births